Tatiana Kovalchuk (born 24 July 1979) is a former professional tennis player from Ukraine.

Biography
Kovalchuk was 16 years of age when she began playing Fed Cup tennis for Ukraine in 1996. In the same year she started on the ITF circuit and had her first tournament win at that season's $10,000 ITF event in Donetsk. She had a win over Anastasia Myskina in the qualifying draw of a tournament on the ITF circuit in 1998. Her biggest title came in 1999, the $25,000 ITF tournament in Reggio Calabria.

In 2000 she competed in the main draw of WTA Tour tournaments at Antwerp and Tashkent, both in the singles and doubles draws. She was beaten in the first round of the singles at both events but was a doubles quarter-finalist in Antwerp's Belgian Open.

Most notably she competed in the main draw of the women's singles at the 2000 French Open. She made it through the qualifying competition by beating Yuka Yoshida, Conchita Martínez Granados and Gréta Arn, then lost to Anne Kremer in the first round. This brought her world ranking to a career high 184 in the world.

She made the last of her 11 Fed Cup tie appearances in 2001, ending her representative career by beating Estonia's Kaia Kanepi.

ITF finals

Singles (2–2)

Doubles (4–3)

References

External links
 
 
 

1979 births
Living people
Ukrainian female tennis players